A land lottery is a method of allocating land ownership or the right to occupy land by lot.

Some examples are:

 Moses' allocation of Promised Land territory to the Israelite tribes by lot, as mandated in Numbers 26:55 and 33:54 and effected by his successor Joshua in Joshua 13:6.
 The Georgia Land Lotteries held between 1805 and 1833
 The allocation of land in the former Kiowa-Comanche and Apache reservation in Oklahoma Territory on August 6, 1901.
 The allocation of reclaimed land at Tule Lake, California, to returning veteran homesteaders after World War II. It is reported that prospective settlers' names were drawn from a pickle jar because the number of applicants was greater than the number of homesteads available.

Israelite land lottery

 combines allocation of land by lot with a distribution system allocating territory according to each tribe's adult male population size. The Pulpit Commentary suggests that the community "probably employed stones, differing in shape or colour, or having some distinguishing mark", which were "placed in a vessel or in the fold of a garment, and drawn or shaken thence", with the outcome being interpreted as a divine decision.

References

Land grants
Book of Numbers
Land of Israel
Book of Joshua
Lotteries